Richard N. Kaplan is an American network television producer. He has worked for CBS, ABC, CNN and MSNBC. Kaplan has also served as executive producer for some of the biggest names in television news journalism, including Walter Cronkite, Peter Jennings, Ted Koppel, Diane Sawyer, Katie Couric, and Christiane Amanpour.

Kaplan started his broadcast journalism career at CBS's WBBM-TV in Chicago. He worked for CBS until 1979, when he moved to ABC. Kaplan stayed at ABC until 1997, when he served as President of CNN/U.S. until 2000. He became Senior Vice-President of ABC News in 2003, and was named President of MSNBC in February 2004. In June 2006, Kaplan resigned as president of MSNBC. In 2007, he replaced Rome Hartman as the executive producer of the CBS Evening News with Katie Couric. In 2011, he was named executive producer of This Week with Christiane Amanpour., and was put in charge of ABC News political coverage, 2012 election coverage, and specials. In August 2012, Kaplan founded Kaplan Media Partners. He has received 46 Emmy Awards.

Early life and education
Richard Kaplan was born in Chicago, Illinois. He graduated from the University of Illinois where he was a member of Alpha Epsilon Pi fraternity.

Broadcast journalism

CBS News (1969–1979)
Kaplan's broadcast journalism career began at CBS News, where he served as an associate producer of CBS Evening News with Walter Cronkite (1974–79) and an associate producer of the CBS Morning News (1971–74). He was a writer, assignment desk editor and producer at WBBM-TV, the CBS-owned station in Chicago (1969–71). At CBS News, he produced news coverage of the American political campaigns and elections in 1974, 1976 and 1978. He was also a producer of the historic visit of Egyptian President Anwar Sadat to Israel for his first meetings with Israeli Prime Minister Menachem Begin.

ABC News (1979–1997)
Kaplan joined ABC News in 1979 as a senior producer for World News Tonight with Peter Jennings. From 1979 to 1997, Kaplan held a variety of positions at ABC News and the ABC Television Network.

Prior to joining Nightline, Kaplan was executive producer of World News This Morning and Good Morning America news.

Kaplan was executive producer of ABC News Nightline from 1984 to 1989. While at Nightline in March, 1985, Kaplan produced a week-long series of broadcasts originating from Johannesburg, South Africa. In 1988, Kaplan was executive producer of Nightline in the Holy Land, a week-long series examining the Arab–Israeli conflict. He was also responsible for a four-hour Nightline National Town Meeting on AIDS.

After a stint during the 1980s as executive producer of ABC's Nightline, Kaplan served as executive producer of ABC's Primetime Live from 1989 to 1994. The trademark of Primetime Live became investigative journalism with broadcasts focusing on child care, racism in the United States, slavery in the Caribbean, unsanitary and dishonest food handling by the major grocery chain Food Lion, and the abuse of patients seeking pap smears and mammograms. Primetime Live also covered the Gulf War, the historic opening of the Berlin Wall, the 1989 San Francisco earthquake and the 1992 Los Angeles riots. In 1990, he produced exclusive tour of the White House and the Kremlin, and later produced ABC's coverage of the final days of Mikhail Gorbachev’s presidency. At the same time he produced Primetime Live, Kaplan was one of the producers and on-scene coordinators of the ABC News coverage of the Gulf War from Saudi Arabia and Kuwait. In September 1991, he was the executive producer of the historic ABC News Town Meeting in which Soviet leaders Mikhail Gorbachev and Boris Yeltsin appeared together live from the Kremlin, to answer questions from Americans viewing in studios in cities across America. Prior to joining Primetime Live, Kaplan created and was executive producer of Capital to Capital, a series of programs which marked the first live exchanges between members of Congress and high-ranking officials at the Kremlin. He was also the executive producer of Viewpoint, the ABC News forum for criticism and analysis of broadcast journalism and of The Koppel Report.

In 1991 Primetime Live aired an exposé of the Food Lion supermarket chain where undercover reporters posed as employees, falsifying their resumes and staging events. The exposé depicted Food Lion as an unethical seller of outdated and contaminated foods. Food Lion sued, and a jury that saw the 45 hours of video from which Kaplan and ABC distilled a 10-minute hit piece awarded Food Lion $5.5 million in punitive damages for fraud committed by Capital Cities-ABC against the company. The award was later reduced by a judge to $316,000. The verdict was then overturned by the U.S. Court of Appeals in Richmond, Virginia. Even though ABC was wrong to do what it had done, the court felt that Food Lion was unable to show that it had been directly injured by ABC's actions.

While executive producer of ABC's PrimeTime Live, Kaplan in 1992 advised then-presidential candidate Bill Clinton how to deal with the Gennifer Flowers affair issue, recommended that the Clintons appear on the CBS program "60 Minutes," and advised the Clintons on how to handle that interview.

In January 1994, Kaplan became executive producer of World News Tonight with Peter Jennings and was responsible for the direction and overall editorial content of the news program.  Under Kaplan's direction in 1994, World News Tonight broadcast live from the beaches of Normandy for the 50th anniversary of D-Day and in a series of special news broadcasts from the Middle East, produced the first live program from the Gaza Strip.

Kaplan served as executive producer of special projects for ABC.  In this post, Kaplan created and produced special programming for all of the network's divisions, including news, entertainment and sports.

CNN (1997–2000)
As President of CNN-US, Kaplan was responsible for all news and programming at the flagship network of the CNN News Group. He instituted a new class of instant news specials, revamped the network's programming line-up with a new program schedule and anchor teams, and increased the number of hours of hard news programming during the weekends.

Under Kaplan, CNN/U.S. galvanized its ability to provide worldwide viewership with the most extensive and up-to-the-minute live coverage and analysis of both breaking and on-going news events, as evidenced in the unprecedented 100 hours of live, global Millennium 2000 coverage, the award-winning Investigating the President series of CNN Special Reports, the 1998 off-year election coverage, John Glenn’s return to space, the Showdown with Iraq series of CNN Special Reports, the week-long series entitled Ground Zero on nuclear proliferation, and various timely news specials on topics including the NATO air strikes against Yugoslavia, the Littleton, Colorado school shootings, the effects of El Niño in 1997 and the network’s groundbreaking series of town hall meetings, including Investigating the President: Media Madness? He also played a major role in the planning and execution of CNN’s Campaign 2000 coverage, producing four multi-candidate primary debates, including the Bradley-Gore debate at Harlem’s Apollo Theater. Kaplan also produced all of CNN’s prime time coverage of both the 2000 Republican and Democratic National Conventions.

In 1998, Kaplan oversaw production of the first documentary for the new show NewsStand. The documentary called "Tailwind," narrated by journalist Peter Arnett, alleged that during the Vietnam War the United States had used sarin gas against women and children in Laos. This report was later discredited and CNN was vilified by the U.S. Department of Defense and many veteran's groups.

Departure of Dobbs
Kaplan repeatedly clashed with CNN anchor Lou Dobbs and was presumed responsible for his abrupt departure from the network in 1999.

On April 20, 1999, CNN was covering President Clinton's speech in Littleton, Colorado, following the Columbine High School massacre. Dobbs ordered the producer to cut away from the speech and return to broadcast Moneyline. Dobbs was countermanded by Kaplan, who ordered CNN to return to the speech. Kaplan later said, "Tell me what journalistic reason there was not to cover the president at Columbine soon after the shootings? Everyone else was doing it." Dobbs announced on the air that "CNN President Rick Kaplan wants us to return to Littleton." A few days later, Dobbs announced that he was leaving the network to start a website devoted to astronautical news.

After Kaplan moved to CNN, U.S. News & World Report found that Kaplan had ordered CNN reporters to "limit the use of the word 'scandal' in reporting on President Clinton's campaign fundraising."  Critics claim this as an example of bias, given Kaplan's longtime friendship with him.

Return to ABC News
Kaplan was senior vice president of ABC News in June 2003.  In this position he oversaw the news division's hard news programs, which include World News Tonight, Nightline, This Week with George Stephanopoulos, World News Tonight Saturday and Sunday, World News Now, World News This Morning as well as ABC News’ Political Unit.  Kaplan led the team that developed ABC News’ 2004 Campaign Buses. Three extra large buses that were outfitted with three live cameras, a six-person live studio, two edit rooms, radio studio, completely Internet friendly with a transmission room allowing it to feed to satellites from anywhere in the country. He also was responsible for overseeing the team which designed and constructed ABC's new newsroom and primary studio and led the design team which redesigned the networks 2004 election graphics and logo. Kaplan was appointed senior vice president after he was brought back to ABC News to coordinate the network's control room production and news coverage of America's War with Iraq. This coverage began with a three-hour ABC News Special: When Diplomacy Fails produced by Kaplan the evening of President Bush's final address to the nation before hostilities began. Across the next four weeks more than 200 hours of live coverage was aired.

Prior to this, Kaplan was a teaching fellow at the Shorenstein Center of Harvard University's John F. Kennedy School of Government. He spent the next two years lecturing there and at a number of universities across the country.

MSNBC (2004–2006)
Kaplan was named President of MSNBC in February 2004.  During his tenure ratings for virtually every hour of the program day rose double digit numbers 24% in daytime, 27% in primetime and across 2005-2006 grew 67% in audience share.  He developed new programs such as The Most with Alison Stewart, Rita Cosby: Live & Direct and The Situation with Tucker Carlson. Kaplan worked to define existing programming such as Hardball with Chris Matthews and Countdown with Keith Olbermann to capture their highest ratings in history. He is credited with stabilizing the previously volatile MSNBC schedule, improving daily news coverage and the better coordination of the cable-broadcast network news assets. He also produced major news events including Election Night 2004 and A Concert for Hurricane Relief.

CBS News (2007–2011)
Kaplan was named executive producer of the CBS Evening News with Katie Couric in March 2007. In revamping this evening newscast he produced multiple hours of special political and election coverage which included series such as Primary Questions and Presidential Questions, which gave viewers a chance to hear all the candidates answer a series of character and life questions and hear those answers in the same broadcast. He also planned and produced extensive issue reports acclaimed for their depth of content, and a series of candidate interviews which included the game changing Katie Couric interviews with Sarah Palin.

Kaplan was the executive producer responsible for all aspects and production of the 2008 Political Conventions in Denver and Minneapolis, 2008 Election Night and the 2009 Inauguration of Barack Obama. He also produced coverage of the shootings at Virginia Tech and the decisions at the conclusion of the rape case at Duke. In Spring 2007 he moved the broadcast to Baghdad and Damascus for a week of programs which took a first look at the progress made by the "surge" and originated from across the country. The program then proceeded to Syria and was highlighted by an interview with Syrian President Bashar al-Assad. Kaplan was named interim executive producer of The Early Show for 10 weeks (which he ran while also EP-ing the Evening News) as it struggled through a period of readjustment due to a personnel change. During this time the program grew in household ratings by 8%...key demographics by 30%...and produced a week of programming live from Greensburg, Kansas, a town destroyed in 2007 by an EF5 tornado that rebuilt itself one year later.

ABC News (2011-2012)

In 2011, Kaplan was named executive producer of ABC News' This Week With Christiane Amanpour, and put in charge of political coverage and 2012 election coverage and specials in May 2011.

Kaplan Media Partners (2012)

Kaplan founded KAPLAN MEDIA PARTNERS in August 2012, a company dedicated to producing quality news programming as either a network consultant or contractor and structured to assist private industry as it navigates the new world of social media while meeting the challenges of dealing with mainstream media.  KMP also delivers media training, crisis management and works with firms who are looking to increase their influence with groundbreaking conferences and intra-corporate communications.

Kaplan Media Partners' first client was Aaron Sorkin and the HBO program, The Newsroom, where Kaplan was hired to be a creative consultant beginning with Season 2.  Writing began in September 2012.

College
Kaplan has devoted a great deal of his time to education, teaching a series of special journalism classes every semester since 1993 at the University of Illinois College Of Communications in Urbana–Champaign. In 1999 Kaplan received an honorary Doctor of Letters from The University of Illinois, his alma mater. He also teaches various journalism classes and has widely taught and lectured at universities across the country; including Duke University, Columbia University, Cornell, Wellesley, Boston College, Columbia College, USC, Berkeley, and the University of Pennsylvania.

Awards
Kaplan has received numerous awards for his work, including 44 Emmy Awards, four Overseas Press Club Awards, three Peabody Awards, two George Polk Awards, four Ohio State Awards, four Alfred I. duPont–Columbia University Awards, two Gold Batons, twelve National Headliner Awards, eight CINE Eagles for Journalistic Excellence and the Distinguished Service award and Bronze Medallion from the Society of Professional Journalists, Sigma Delta Chi. In 2008 Kaplan was awarded an Honorary Doctorate by Westfield State College.

In January 2001, Kaplan was chosen to be the visiting Lombard Lecturer at the Shorenstein Center for Press, Politics and Public Policy of the John F. Kennedy School of Government at Harvard University. His course "Politics and Public Policy 359: Do American Media Meet the Needs of a Modern Democracy?" included graduate students as well as underclassmen.

In September 2001 Kaplan was asked to remain at Harvard for the complete academic year, where he was named a Fellow of the Shorenstein Center. In August 2003 Kaplan was awarded the appointment of adjunct Fellow at the Shorenstein Center where he continues to consult and lecture.

References

External links

Year of birth missing (living people)
Living people
University of Illinois alumni
American Broadcasting Company executives
American Jews
CNN executives
Businesspeople from Chicago
American television news producers
Television producers from Illinois